Sidi Mahrez Mosque, also known as Mohamed Bey El Mouradi Mosque, is a mosque in Tunis, Tunisia. It is an official historical monument.

Localization 
This mosque is located in Medina area of the city.

History 
It was built by Mohamed Bey El Mouradi, son of Mourad Bey II in 1692 in honor of the patron-saint of Tunis Sidi Mahrez.

Structure 
It is strongly influenced by Ottoman architecture, showing similarities to the Sultan Ahmed II Mosque of Istanbul with a central dome with cupolas occupying the four corners of the square of the prayer hall. Polychrome tiles were imported from Iznik (Turkey) to cover a large part of the wall in the direction of Mecca and the grand pillars that support the central dome.

The interior of the mosque was renovated in the 1960s.

References

External links

Mosques in the medina of Tunis
Religious buildings and structures completed in 1692
1692 establishments in the Ottoman Empire
Ottoman architecture in Tunisia
Articles containing video clips
17th-century mosques